War Paint is the fourth studio album released by American country music artist Lorrie Morgan. The album was released via BNA Records in 1994. It contains the singles "My Night to Howl," "If You Came Back from Heaven," and "Heart Over Mind." Also included are covers of George Jones' "A Good Year for the Roses", recorded here as a duet with Sammy Kershaw, and Jeannie Seely's "Don't Touch Me." The cassette version of the album omits the track "Exit 99."

Thom Owens of Allmusic rated the album two-and-a-half stars out of five, saying that "Morgan still sings beautifully, but her clean contemporary country arrangements are as predictable as her material. The three hit singles[…]hold up really well."

Track listing

Personnel
As listed in liner notes.
Michael Black – background vocals
Larry Byrom – acoustic guitar, electric guitar
Glen Duncan – fiddle, mandolin
Paul Franklin – steel guitar, Dobro
Vicki Hampton – background vocals
Dann Huff – electric guitar
Mitch Humphries - keyboards
Jana King – background vocals
Alison Krauss – background vocals
Paul Leim – drums
Carl Marsh – keyboards
Brent Mason – electric guitar
Terry McMillan – harmonica, percussion
Lorrie Morgan – vocals
Steve Nathan – organ
Cindy Richardson-Walker – background vocals
Brent Rowan – acoustic guitar, electric guitar
Lisa Silver – background vocals
Pam Tillis – background vocals
Billy Joe Walker Jr. – acoustic guitar
Dennis Wilson – background vocals
Glenn Worf – bass guitar, upright bass
Curtis "Mr. Harmony" Young – background vocals

Strings performed by the Asa Drori Orchestra, arranged by Charles Calello. Horns arranged by Jerry Hey

Chart performance

References

1994 albums
BNA Records albums
Lorrie Morgan albums
Albums produced by Richard Landis